Lee Ting-kuo may refer to:
 Ting-Kuo Lee, Taiwanese physicist
Li Dingguo (1621–1662), general affiliated with the Southern Ming

See also
 Li Kou-tin (born 1938), Taiwanese table tennis player
Feng Ting-kuo (1950–2018), Taiwanese politician